This was the first edition of this tennis tournament.

Vitalia Diatchenko won her third career WTA 125 title, defeating Zhang Shuai 6–0, 6–4 in the final.

Seeds

Draw

Finals

Top half

Bottom half

Qualifying

Seeds

Qualifiers

Lucky loser

Draw

First qualifier

Second qualifier

Third qualifier

Fourth qualifier

References

External links
 Singles Main Draw
 Singles Qualifying Draw

Open Angers Arena Loire - Singles